Gnantin Yann Gboho (born 14 January 2001) is a professional footballer who plays as a midfielder for Belgian club Cercle Brugge. Born in Ivory Coast, he is a former France youth international.

Club career
On 24 May 2018, Gboho signed his first professional contract with Rennes. He made his debut for the club in the 2019 Trophée des Champions, losing 2–1 to Paris Saint-Germain on 3 August 2019. He scored his first goal in Ligue 1 against Toulouse on 27 October 2019.

On 22 July 2021, Gboho joined Vitesse in the Netherlands on loan.

On 19 August 2022, Gboho signed a three-year contract with Cercle Brugge in Belgium.

Personal life
Gboho's uncle, Ambroise, is also a professional footballer. As are his cousins, Guéla and Désiré Doué.

References

External links
 
 
 
 
 Stade Rennais Profile

2001 births
Living people
People from Man, Ivory Coast
French footballers
Association football midfielders
French sportspeople of Ivorian descent
France youth international footballers
Ivorian footballers
Ivorian emigrants to France
Stade Rennais F.C. players
SBV Vitesse players
Cercle Brugge K.S.V. players
Ligue 1 players
Championnat National 2 players
Championnat National 3 players
Eredivisie players
French expatriate footballers
Expatriate footballers in the Netherlands
French expatriate sportspeople in the Netherlands
Expatriate footballers in Belgium
French expatriate sportspeople in Belgium